90 Minutes for Mandela was a charity football match held on 18 July 2007 in Cape Town, South Africa, to mark the 89th birthday of Nelson Mandela. The match ended in a 3–3 draw between an African XI and a Rest of the World XI. Africa played in an all-white strip, while the Rest of the World team played in an all-black strip. A few hours before the game, Sepp Blatter granted honorary membership of FIFA to the Makana Football Association, a football league set up by prisoners on Robben Island, where Mandela was imprisoned.

Mandela did not attend the match, he did though, send a message via video. Proceeds of the match went to programmes supported by the Nelson Mandela Foundation. Before the game an official match shirt was presented to Mandela with the number 89 on the reverse.

Match result
The match, played in front of a crowd of 35,412 ended in a 3–3 draw between an African XI and a Rest of the World XI. Iván Zamorano, Ruud Gullit and Julen Guerrero scored for the Rest of the World with Abedi Pele and Hossam Hassan (2) scoring for the Africans.

Squads
Pelé kicked the match off ceremonially. Over 50 players were selected to appear in the match, to represent the two teams. Though the final line up for each team is as per below.

Africa XI
The Africa XI was coached by Jean Manga-Onguene of Cameroon and Jomo Sono of South Africa.

Rest of the World XI
The Rest of the World XI was coached by Roy Hodgson of England and Claude Le Roy of France.

Nelson Mandela Farewell Game
FIFA organised a similar all-star match on 17 August 1999 to honour Mandela when he stepped down as South African president, which was held at Ellis Park in Johannesburg in front of a crowd of 40,000 between a Mandela XI, which featured, among others, Lucas Radebe, Mark Fish, Celestine Babayaro, Samuel Kuffour, Kalusha Bwalya, Hossam Hassan, Benni McCarthy, Nwankwo Kanu, Titi Camara and Shabani Nonda and a FIFA World XI which included, among others, Jorge Campos, Taribo West, Rigobert Song, Branco, Dunga, Thomas Häßler, Mustapha Hadji, Luis Hernández, Viorel Moldovan, Murat Yakin, Lubomir Moravcik, Abedi Pele and Jean-Pierre Papin. That particular match ended 2–2.

References

External links
 FIFA Match report

Association football matches in Africa
2007–08 in South African soccer
Nelson Mandela
Charity football matches